Below is the list of the D2 class locomotives that ran on the London, Brighton and South Coast Railway.

Sources
Bradley, D.L. (1972) The locomotives of the London, Brighton & South Coast Railway: Part 2, The Railway Correspondence and Travel Society, 

D2list
0-4-2 locomotives
LbandScr D2 Class Locomotives
LbandScr D2 Class Locomotives